The {{nihongo|Tsukushi-class survey ship|筑紫型測量艦,|Tsukushi-gata sokuryōkan}} was a class of auxiliary ships of the Imperial Japanese Navy (IJN), serving during  World War II. The class consists of two subclasses, which this article handles collectively.

Background
Since the Meiji period, the Imperial Japanese Navy had carried out hydrographic survey with old naval vessels. While sufficient for routine peacetime survey duties, these obsolete vessels were deemed too slow for service in combat zones. Furthermore, these vessels were essentially fighting ships, thus were not able to carry many surveying devices. Therefore, in the 1920s and the 1930s, many of these ships were retired. The IJN then allotted Katsuriki and Komahashi to survey duties; however, these ships were of merchant ship designs, and were still too slow for the IJN. It then became clear that the IJN required purpose-built ships for hydrographic survey duties.

In 1930, the IJN proposed two 1,600-ton survey ships (Project Number J6) to the Ministry of Finance, but were unable to pass assessments. In 1937, IJN was finally able to get a building budget for one 1,400-ton survey ship. This is Project Number J11, later named Tsukushi.

Design
IJN gave her armament and maneuverability similar to that of Kaibokan several years later, as she was expected to carry out surveys in combat zones. She also possessed a floatplane for aerial survey. Low speed cruising was demanded from her for survey works; therefore she possessed three shafts, with low speed cruising used only the center shaft.

Service
Tsukushi was completed on 17 December 1941, and was assigned to the 3rd Fleet the same day. Between 1 January 1942–March 1942, she went to the front in the Dutch East Indies campaign. On 10 March, she was assigned to the 2nd Southern Expeditionary Fleet; she carried out survey works off Surabaya, Balikpapan, and Davao until August. She took maintenance in Singapore between 26 August–7 September. On 25 September, she was assigned to the 4th Fleet; she carried out survey works off Gilbert Islands and Jaluit Atoll. She took maintenance in Yokohama between 27 March 1943–May.

On 20 May 1943, she was assigned to the 8th Fleet, sailed to Rabaul on 6 June, afterward she served in the Solomon Islands. On 3 November, she departed from Rabaul for rescue the Tei-4 Convoy. However she entered minefield off Kavieng; she struck a magnetic mine and sunk on 4 November. She was removed from the naval ship list on 5 January 1944.

A second ship of the class, Miho, was canceled on 5 May 1944.

Ships in classes

Tsukushi class
Project number J11. Only one vessel was built under the Maru 3 Programme.

Miho class
Project number J11C. Only one vessel was planned under the Kai-Maru 5 Programme, however, she became only a paper plan.

Footnotes

Bibliography
 Ships of the World special issue Vol.47 Auxiliary Vessels of the Imperial Japanese Navy, Kaijinsha, (Japan), March 1997
 The Maru Special, Japanese Naval Vessels No.34, Japanese Auxiliary ships, Ushio Shobō (Japan), December 1979
 Senshi Sōsho Vol.31, Naval armaments and war preparation (1), "Until November 1941", Asagumo Simbun (Japan), November 1969
 Senshi Sōsho Vol.88, Naval armaments and war preparation (2), "And after the outbreak of war", Asagumo Simbun (Japan), October 1975
  (SNAJ), Histories of shipbuilding in Shōwa period (1),  (Japan), September 1977

World War II naval ships of Japan
Ships built by Mitsubishi Heavy Industries